The Couches des Marmontains are a sedimentary formation deposited during the middle Cretaceous (Albian to Cenomanian). It consists of sandstones and black shales. The formation is 5 to 30 m thick. The Couches des Marmontains overly the Couches de l’Aroley and underlie the Couches de Saint Christophe. All three units together make up the post-rift sequence of the Valais ocean. Outcrops can be found north of Bourg-Saint-Maurice.

The Couches des Marmontains can be found in the following nappes:
External Valais
Moûtiers unit
Roc de l'Enfer unit
Petit St. Bernard unit
Internal Valais
Versoyen unit

The type locality and namesake of the formation is the mountain Marmontains and the Val Ferret in Orsières, Canton Valais, Switzerland. It was first described in 1955 by Rudolf Trümpy.

The Marmontains Formation can be correlated with the Valzeina Formation of Graubünden and black shales in the Engadine.

References

Geologic formations of France
Geologic formations of Switzerland
Cretaceous System of Europe
Albian Stage
Cenomanian Stage
Cretaceous France
Cretaceous Switzerland
Geology of the Alps